New Orleans, Louisiana, U.S.A., includes such notable streets as:

 Allen Toussaint Boulevard
 Almonaster Avenue
 Audubon Place (private access only)
 Baronne Street
 Basin Street
 Bayou Road
 Bienville Street
 Bourbon Street
 Broad Street
 Burgundy Street
 Calliope Street
 Camp Street
 Canal Boulevard
 Canal Street
 Carondelet Street
 Carrollton Avenue
 Chartres Street
 City Park Avenue
 Claiborne Avenue
 Conti Street
 Dante Street
 Dauphine Street
 Decatur Street
 Desire Street
 Dryades Street
 Dumaine Street
 Earhart Expressway, an extension of Earhart Boulevard 
 Elysian Fields Avenue
 Esplanade Avenue
 Exchange Place (pedestrian only)
 Felicity Street
 Freret Street
 Frenchmen Street
 Gayoso Street
 Gentilly Boulevard
 Girod Street
 Gravier Street
 Henry Clay Avenue
 Howard Avenue
 Iberville Street
 Jackson Avenue
 Julia Street
 Lafayette Street
 Lakeshore Drive
 Lee Circle
 Louisiana Avenue
 Lowerline Street
 Loyola Avenue
 Magazine Street
 Magnolia Street
 Marengo Street
 Martin Luther King Jr. Boulevard
 McAlister Place (pedestrian only)
 Napoleon Avenue
 Norman C. Francis Parkway
 Oak Street
 Oretha Castle Haley Boulevard
 Orleans Street
 Pearl Street
 Peters Street
 Pontchartrain Expressway
 Poydras Street
 Prytania Street
 Rampart Street
 Royal Street
 Simon Bolivar Avenue
 St. Ann Street
 St. Charles Avenue
 St. Claude Avenue
 St. Louis Street
 St. Peter Street
 St. Philip Street
 Tchoupitoulas Street
 Toulouse Street
 Tulane Avenue
 Upperline Street
 Ursulines Street
 Washington Avenue

References

See also

Barthelemy Lafon (1769–1820), namer of Lower Garden District streets
Bernard de Marigny (1785–1868), namer of Faubourg Marigny & Bywater streets
History of New Orleans
Neighborhoods in New Orleans
Downtown New Orleans
French Quarter
Uptown New Orleans

 
New Orleans
Geography of New Orleans
Transportation in New Orleans
New Orleans
streets